Eurema regularis, the even-bordered grass yellow or regular grass yellow, is a butterfly in the family Pieridae. It is found in Senegal, Guinea, Sierra Leone, Liberia, Ivory Coast, Ghana, Togo, Nigeria, the Republic of the Congo, Angola, the Democratic Republic of the Congo, Ethiopia, Rwanda, Burundi, Kenya to Zambia, eastern Zimbabwe and western Mozambique. The habitat consists of woodland and forest margins.

Adults are on wing year round.

References

Seitz, A. Die Gross-Schmetterlinge der Erde 13: Die Afrikanischen Tagfalter. Plate 22 e

Butterflies described in 1876
regularis
Butterflies of Africa
Taxa named by Arthur Gardiner Butler